The discography of American country artist Jeannie Seely contains 16 studio albums, three compilation albums and 36 singles. Releasing several singles for the Challenge label, she moved to Nashville, Tennessee and signed with Monument Records in 1966. Releasing "Don't Touch Me" as a single, it became a major country hit, reaching number 2 on the Billboard Hot Country Singles chart. It also became her only single to reach the Billboard Hot 100, peaking at number 85. The success led to the release of her debut studio album entitled The Seely Style, which reached number 8 on the Billboard Top Country Albums chart.

Seely had several more major hits during the 1960s: "It's Only Love" (1966), "A Wanderin' Man" (1967) and "I'll Love You More (Than You'll Need)" (1968). She also released three more studio albums during this time. This included Thanks, Hank!, which peaked at number 17 on the country albums chart in 1967. Leaving Monument, Seely signed with Decca Records and paired with country artist Jack Greene for a series of duet recordings. Their first single, "Wish I Didn't Have to Miss You" (1969), reached number 2 on the Billboard country chart. Spawning an album, the project peaked at number 18 on the country albums chart in 1970. After a series of singles and two albums, Seely released two major hits in 1973: "Can I Sleep in Your Arms" and "Lucky Ladies". The success prompted the release of an album of the same name, which peaked at number 15 on the country albums chart.

Seely continued recording for major labels until the end of the 1970s. Her final singles on Columbia Records became minor hits on the Billboard country chart. Her final chart appearance was 1978's "Take Me to Bed", which reached number 97. Although still touring and performing, she did not release further studio albums again until the 1990s. Among the highlights of her later material is 2003's Life's Highway, an album of bluegrass material. She also issued album of classic country in 2011 entitled Vintage Country. Her most recent release was in 2017 via Cheyenne Records, Written in Song.

Albums

Studio albums

Soundtrack albums

Live albums

Compilation albums

Singles

Music videos

Other appearances

Notes

References

External links
 Jeannie Seely at Discogs

Country music discographies
Discographies of American artists